Manrich Kotze (born 6 April 1992) is a South African cricketer. He played in one List A match for Boland in 2010.

See also
 List of Boland representative cricketers

References

External links
 

1992 births
Living people
South African cricketers
Boland cricketers
Place of birth missing (living people)